This'll Make You Whistle is a 1936 British musical comedy film directed by Herbert Wilcox and starring Jack Buchanan, Elsie Randolph and William Kendall. The film was based on the stage musical of the same title which Buchanan had starred in.

Synopsis
A man-about-town accidentally finds himself engaged to two women at the same time, the horse-mad Laura and the sweet-natured Joan who is dominated by her disapproving mother. His attempts to convince the guardian of the former that he is completely unsuited to marriage, while trying to persuade the mother of the latter that he is, are further complicated by the behaviour of his two friends and the appearance of an attractive life model named Bobbie Rivers. Further confusion ensues when the action shifts from London to the French resort of Le Touquet.

Cast
 Jack Buchanan as Bill Hoppings
 Elsie Randolph as Bobbie Rivers
 Jean Gillie as Joan Longhurst
 William Kendall as Reggie Benson
 David Hutcheson as Archie Codrington
 Maidie Hope as Mrs. Longhurst
 Anthony Holles as Sebastian Venables
 Marjorie Brooks as Laura Buxton
 Bunty Payne as Betty
 Miki Hood as Clarice
 Scott Harrold as Gendarme
 Irene Vere as Mrs. Crimp
 Frederick Burtwell as Hotel Manager

Stage production
The musical was first performed on stage at Southsea in December 1935, before a long run at the Palace Theatre and then Daly's in London's West End. The cast included Jack Buchanan as Bill Hoppings, Jean Gillie as Joan Longhurst, Sylvia Leslie as Laura Buxton, Maidie Hope as Mrs Longhurst, Elsie Randolph as Bobbie Rivers, Diana Lonsdale as Betty, Irene Vere as Mrs Crimp, Jill Ricarde as Clarice, and Eunice Crowther as Dora.

In Australia, the show was known as The Melody of London.

Critical reception
The New York Times wrote, "It isn't enough that Mars is attacking; England has just exploded a hot-air bomb in the immediate vicinity of the Fifty-fifth Street Playhouse. "This'll Make You Whistle" was the tag on it. We're whistling all right—one of those barely audible sounds made by pursing the lips and exhaling. Herbert Wilcox, who should have known better, launched the projectile, first charging it with people like Jack Buchanan, Elsie Randolph and Antony Holles and detonating it with a slow-burning musical comedy plot about a man with one fiancée too many. Typical line: "You're the bigamist fool in London." Typical scene: Mr. Buchanan and a pal, disguised as bearded gendarmes, being chased by twenty bearded gendarmes. Typical reaction; Ouch!"

References

External links

1936 films
British musical comedy films
1936 musical comedy films
1930s English-language films
Films directed by Herbert Wilcox
Films set in London
Films set in France
British black-and-white films
Films shot at British International Pictures Studios
1930s British films